Krishna Avanti Primary School, Leicester is a Hindu faith primary school in Leicester, United Kingdom that is part of the Avanti Schools Trust. It was the first state-funded Hindu school in Leicester. The school is open to students of Hindu background, but half (50%) of places available in the school are also reserved for local students of various faith backgrounds. The school is based at Evington Hall, a Grade II listed building, built about 1840, which in the past was a convent school, then part of Leicester Junior Grammar School.

See also
 Avanti Fields School
 International Society for Krishna Consciousness

References

External links
Official website

Primary schools in Leicestershire
Hindu schools in the United Kingdom
Schools affiliated with the International Society for Krishna Consciousness
International Society for Krishna Consciousness
Free Schools in England with a Formal Faith Designation
Free schools in England